Weston “Wes” Mitchell (December 8, 1890 – July 1962) was the head basketball coach for the Minnesota Golden Gophers for one lone season in 1944-45. Mitchell replaced Carl Nordly as coach after Nordly had steered the Gophers to a 17-23 record over two seasons after replacing long-time coach Dave MacMillan. McMillan came back to coach the Gophers again for the 1945-46 season. The Gophers went 8-13 during Mitchell’s one-year tenure – with a 4-8 record in the Big Ten – which placed them in a tie for sixth place. Mitchell graduated from Wisconsin-Stout in 1913. Before becoming a coach for the Gophers, Mitchell had been the head coach at Minneapolis Central, where one of his players was John Kundla — the Hall of Fame coach, who had led the Minneapolis Lakers to five NBA titles and would later be the Minnesota Gophers head coach.

References

1890 births
1962 deaths
Minnesota Golden Gophers men's basketball coaches